Wülflingen is a district in the Swiss city of Winterthur, situated in the lower Töss Valley. It is district number six, and comprises the quarters Weinberg, Oberfeld, Lindenplatz, Niederfeld, Neuburg, Hardau, Härti and Taggenberg.

Wülflingen was formerly a municipality of its own, but was incorporated into Winterthur in 1922.

Transport 
Winterthur-Wülflingen railway station is a stop of the Zürich S-Bahn on line S41.

References

Former municipalities of the canton of Zürich
Winterthur